Off Road may refer to:
Off Road (video game), 2008 video game published by Xplosiv; also known as Ford Racing Off Road
Super Off Road, 1989 arcade game released by Leland Corporation
Off Road Challenge, 1998 console game released by Nintendo

See also
Off-roading, term for driving a specialized vehicle on unpaved roads